Lakmal Perera (born 7 January 1986) is a Ghanaian cricketer. In May 2019, he was named in Ghana's squad for the Regional Finals of the 2018–19 ICC T20 World Cup Africa Qualifier tournament in Uganda. He made his Twenty20 International (T20I) debut for Ghana against Namibia on 20 May 2019.

References

External links
 

1986 births
Living people
Ghanaian cricketers
Ghana Twenty20 International cricketers
Place of birth missing (living people)
Ghanaian people of Sri Lankan descent